Notable achievements, records, and statistics of the World Club Challenge are listed below:

Records and statistics
NOTE: The below statistics reflect records from all World Club Challenge matches from 1976 to present. They only include the finals of World Club Series  2015 and 2017 and of the 1997 World Club Championship.

Match records

Biggest win

Highest scoring game

Lowest scoring game

Individual records

Top try scorers

Most tries in a game

Most points in a game

Most goals

Drop goals

Attendance

Top 5 Attendances

World Club Series only
The World Club Series was the temporary name of the tournament following its temporary restructure between 2015 and 2017.

Biggest win

Highest scoring game

Lowest scoring game

Individual

Top try scorers
List of players who have scored 2 or more tries.

Top goal scorers

See also

References

World Club Challenge
Rugby league records and statistics